The 17 municipalities of the Satakunta Region in Finland are divided on three sub-regions.



Northern Satakunta sub-region 
Jämijärvi
Kankaanpää
Karvia
Siikainen (Siikais)

Pori sub-region 
Harjavalta
Huittinen (Vittis)
Kokemäki (Kumo)
Merikarvia (Sastmola)
Nakkila
Pomarkku (Påmark)
Pori (Björneborg)
Ulvila (Ulvsby)

Rauma sub-region 
Eura
Eurajoki (Euraåminne)
Rauma (Raumo)
Säkylä

See also 
Western Finland
Regions of Western Finland

External links